Henry Rylah is an English footballer who plays as a midfielder for League One club Charlton Athletic.

Career

Charlton Athletic
Coming through the youth system of Charlton Athletic, Rylah made his professional debut for the club as a 16–year–old, coming off the bench in the 81st minute of a 2–1 EFL Trophy victory at home against Brighton & Hove Albion U21 on 2 November 2022.

Rylah made his second appearance for the club on 22 November 2022, again coming off the bench, in a EFL Trophy Second Round 3–2 defeat away at Plymouth Argyle.

Career statistics

References

External links
 

Living people
2005 births
English footballers
Charlton Athletic F.C. players
Association football midfielders